Bouchaib El Moubarki (born 12 January 1978) is a former Moroccan footballer.

Club career
He also played for the famous Qatari side, Al-Sadd Sports Club and Grenoble.
El Moubarki was a participant in the 2000 FIFA Club World Championship, during which he scored a goal against Saudi Arabian club Al-Nassr FC and was sent off in the match against Real Madrid after clashing with Guti. in 2004 he had a short move to Al Wasl FC which ended prematurely due to not being fit.

International career
El Moubarki is a member of the Morocco national football team. He was part of the Moroccan 2004 Olympic football team, who exited in the first round, finishing third in group D, behind group winners Iraq and runners-up Costa Rica. He also competed at the 2000 Summer Olympics in Sydney.

Career statistics

Club career stats

International

International goals
Scores and results list Morocco's goal tally first, score column indicates score after each El Moubarki goal.

References

Sources

External links
 

1978 births
Living people
Moroccan footballers
Footballers from Casablanca
Morocco international footballers
Moroccan expatriate footballers
Olympic footballers of Morocco
Footballers at the 2000 Summer Olympics
Footballers at the 2004 Summer Olympics
2008 Africa Cup of Nations players
Grenoble Foot 38 players
Ligue 1 players
Moghreb Tétouan players
Ligue 2 players
Al-Wasl F.C. players
Raja CA players
Al Sadd SC players
Al-Wakrah SC players
Al-Rayyan SC players
Al-Ahli Saudi FC players
Al-Arabi SC (Qatar) players
Qatar Stars League players
Saudi Professional League players
Expatriate footballers in the United Arab Emirates
Association football forwards
UAE Pro League players